Teanu (or Tevai) is the second island in size of the Vanikoro group, in the Temotu Province of the Solomon Islands. It is located northeast of the main island of the group, Banie.

Population
Teanu has currently only one inhabited village, Puma.

Teanu has given its name to Teanu, the main language of Vanikoro. The latter is sometimes known also as Puma.

In popular culture 
The latitude and longitude coordinates of the virtual cycling world of Watopia on the Zwift cycling platform coincide with this island, and websites such as Strava therefore show Zwift rides overlain on a map of Teanu even though Teanu has no roads and rides seem to frequently cross between water and land.

References

External links
 Maps of Vanikoro, showing location of Teanu.

Islands of the Solomon Islands